John Edward Robinson (February 20, 1921 – March 2, 2000) was an American professional baseball player, a right-handed pitcher whose career lasted eleven seasons (1941–1942; 1946–1954), including three games played in the Major Leagues for the Boston Red Sox in 1949. He served in the United States Navy during World War II.

A native of Orange, New Jersey, he was raised in Bloomfield, New Jersey and graduated from Bloomfield High School in 1939 before attending Bordentown Military Institute. He appeared in three games pitched, all in relief, during May for the  Boston Red Sox. In those appearances, Robinson posted a 2.25 ERA in four full innings of work, giving up one run on four hits and one walk while striking out one. He did not have a decision or save.

Robinson died in Ormond Beach, Florida, at the age of 79.

See also
1949 Boston Red Sox season

References

External links
Baseball Reference
Retrosheet

1921 births
2000 deaths
Amsterdam Rugmakers players
Baseball players from New Jersey
Beaumont Exporters players
Binghamton Triplets players
Bloomfield High School (New Jersey) alumni
Bordentown Military Institute alumni
Boston Red Sox players
Kansas City Blues (baseball) players
Louisville Colonels (minor league) players
Major League Baseball pitchers
Newark Bears (IL) players
Ottawa A's players
People from Bloomfield, New Jersey
People from Orange, New Jersey
Portland Beavers players
Sportspeople from Essex County, New Jersey
Syracuse Chiefs players
United States Navy personnel of World War II